Martina Lorenzetto (born 18 April 1992) is an Italian long jumper.

Lorenzetto won two national championships at individual senior level.

National titles
Italian Athletics Championships
Long jump: 2015

Italian Athletics Indoor Championships
Long jump: 2016

References

External links
 

1992 births
Living people
Italian female long jumpers
Sportspeople from Treviso
21st-century Italian women